The Quest for Fire (literally The War of Fire) is a 1911 Belgian fantasy novel by "J.-H. Rosny", the pseudonym of two brothers; the author was actually the elder of the two, Joseph Henri Honoré Boex (1856–1940). It was first published in English in an abridged edition in 1967.

It was adapted into the critically acclaimed 1981 film Quest for Fire starring Ron Perlman. The film is not a faithful adaption of the book.

Setting 

The Quest for Fire takes place in 100,000 BC in Europe. The fauna of this period is omnipresent, including mammoths, cave lions, aurochs, cave bears, saber-toothed cats, giant elks and saiga antelopes. Several humanoid ethnicities live alongside animals: the Ulams (Neandertal-like hunters-gatherers who worship the fire and are able to ally themselves with beasts), the Wahs (people without shoulders from marshes), the Blue-Haired Men (huge four-handed simians with a bluish fur), the Men-Eaters (bestial cannibals) and the Red Dwarfs (extremely warmongering and xenophobic pygmies).

References

External Links
 

1911 fantasy novels
Historical novels
Belgian speculative fiction novels
Novels set in prehistory
Prehistoric people in popular culture
Works published under a pseudonym
Pantheon Books books
Historical fantasy novels
Belgian novels adapted into films